Simula Metropolitan Center for Digital Engineering AS (SimulaMet) is a non-profit research organization jointly owned by Simula Research Laboratory and Oslo Metropolitan University. It is the home of Simula’s research activities on networks and communications, machine learning and artificial intelligence, and IT management. The mission of SimulaMet is to do research in digital engineering at the highest international level, to educate and supervise Ph.D.- and master students at OsloMet, and to contribute to innovation in society through collaboration, startup-companies, and licensing of research results.

Background  
The center was established in 2018 to serve the national and European need to strengthen research and education capacity in the ICT and digitalization sector.

Organization 
The center is located in OsloMet’s premises in the Bislett neighborhood in Oslo. Olav Lysne is the director of SimulaMet, and Simula Research Laboratory owns 51 percent in the company, while OsloMet - Storbyuniversitetet owns 49 percent.

Research and activities  
As a partner of OsloMet the center has contributed to the development of a Ph.D. program in digital engineering, as well as the establishment of the OsloMet AI Lab. OsloMet AI Lab is a research center that manages research and student projects in artificial intelligence.

The center has established five research areas within digitalization and IT. These include the Center for Resilient Networks and Applications (CRNA) and Effective Digitalization of the Public Sector (EDOS). These centers receive funding from the Norwegian Ministry of Local Government and Modernization.

The Center for Resilient Networks and Applications (CRNA) was established in 2014 and focuses on the robustness and security of ICT infrastructures. The Ministry of Local Government and Modernization has given the center specific responsibilities through a mandate. This includes the operation of an infrastructure for monitoring the state of the Norwegian telecommunications infrastructure, in particular the mobile broadband networks, and publishing an annual report on that.

Effective Digitalization of the Public Sector (EDOS) was established in 2020 and will provide new knowledge on effective digitalization of the public sector. This includes input to improve processes and methods for the development of digital solutions, as well as research-based assistance to the Ministry of Local Government and Modernization and other parts of the public sector.

References

Computer science institutes in Norway